Pérez Zeledón is the nineteenth canton of the province of San José in Costa Rica, located in the Brunca region. The capital city of the canton is San Isidro de El General.

The canton's boundaries are established by the Río Savegre on the northwest, the Río Guabo and a series of coastal mountain ranges on the southwest and south, and the peaks of the highest mountains of the Cordillera de Talamanca (Talamanca Mountain Range) on the east. In the middle of the canton, the Río General, from which the canton's capital city takes its name, runs north to south.

History 
Pérez Zeledón was created on 9 October 1931 by decree 31. Originally with four initial districts: Ureña, El General, Daniel Flores, and Rivas, with Ureña being the capital.

Early Costa Rican Settlements
Near the end of the 19th century, between 1870 and 1899, there were quite a few families living in El General valley. The hamlets (Spanish: Caseríos) of El General, Palmares, Rivas, and Ureña were further populated from 1900 onward.

The Caserío area of Ureña grew significantly, and by 1911, during Ricardo Jiménez Oreamuno's administration, the Refuges of Ojo de Agua, El Cerro de la Muerte, and División were established. These refuges would further advance the growth of the region known today as Pérez Zeledón and El General Valley.

Costa Rican Civil War
San Isidro de El General, Pérez Zeledón's capital, was awarded the recognition of Ciudad Mártir, regarding the civil war of 1948, as established by Decree Nº274. This decree established official legal recognition of the city's participation in the civil war of 1948. A section of the decree states (in Spanish):

la Junta Fundadora de la Segunda República, apreciando el noble esfuerzo y la valiosa contribución de San Isidro de El General, se siente obligada a hacer un público y oficial reconocimiento de tan loable conducta para que de ninguna manera quede ella relegada al olvido, sino que constantemente sea exaltada como merecen los grandes hechos dignos de vida eterna en los fastos nacionales.

In English this would loosely translate into:

The Founding Junta of the Second Republic, appreciating the noble effort and valuable contribution of San Isidro de El General, feels compelled to make a public and official recognition of such praiseworthy conduct that by no means be it relegated to oblivion, but rather constantly be exalted as great deeds merit worth of eternal life in the national splendor.

Pérez Zeledón was also the location of significant battles during the Costa Rican Civil War. The most notable battle was the Battle of San Isidro de El General. This battle was carried out at around 6:30 a.m. when 200 government forces engaged the revolutionaries at the city's central plaza. The battle was won by José Figueres Ferrer and his revolutionary forces, which secured the southern pacific region of Costa Rica in rebel hands.

Geography 
Pérez Zeledón has an area of  km2 and a mean elevation of  metres.

Districts 
The canton of Pérez Zeledón is subdivided into the following districts:
 San Isidro de El General
 El General
 Daniel Flores
 Rivas
 San Pedro
 Platanares
 Pejibaye
 Cajón
 Barú
 Río Nuevo
 Páramo
 La Amistad

Demographics 

For the 2011 census, Pérez Zeledón had a population of  inhabitants.

Economy

The canton of Pérez Zeledón's economic development has been characterized mostly by agriculture, livestock, trade, industry and tourism. One factor that has driven this economic development is the canton's unique geographic positioning; making it a sort of 'bridge' between Costa Rica's capital (San José) and the southern areas of the country, especially those that border Panamá.

Important agricultural activities:

 Sugar Cane cultivation
 Coffee
 Tiquizque cultivation 
 Banana cultivation
 Blackberry cultivation

The first two products are the most important in the region.

Livestock activities are also economically relevant, with pigs and cattle being the most important. The latter is used for fattening and dairy.

Commercial activities have emerged with boom in recent decades, largely due to the establishment of credit unions, banks, local companies, media, and various other companies of the central valley (San José) setting operations in the canton.

Tourism
Its main attraction is its ecological diversity. There are such sites as the Chirripó National Park (one of the highest peak in Central America and the Caribbean, with an elevation of 3,820 meters above sea level) and great scenic beauty, flora and fauna all throughout.

Among other attractions are the journeys along the rapids.

Another park of prominence in the area is the Parque Internacional La Amistad, literally 'The Friendship International Park'.

Education

The first elementary school in Pérez Zeledón was established during Ascensión Esquivel Ibarra's government (1902-1906). It was called Escuela Mixta de Ureña and was located in the Ureña district, south of San Isidro de El General's central park. After the Costa Rican Civil War the school was moved to a new building located 100 meters past San Isidro de El General's main entrance. It currently serves under the name "Escuela 12 de Marzo", in honour of the start of the Costa Rican Civil War (which had just ended when the school was re-inaugurated at its current location).

Transportation

Road transportation 
The canton is covered by the following road routes:

Notable people 
Keylor Navas, football goalkeeper

References

Cantons of San José Province
Populated places in San José Province